The Land Before Time VIII: The Big Freeze is a 2001 direct-to-video animated adventure musical film and the eighth film in The Land Before Time series.

Plot 
Ducky's relationship with her brother Spike becomes rambunctious and turbulent when he repeatedly keeps her awake at night with his snoring and after he ate her tree stars (which their mother packed specifically for her on their first day of school). She tells Cera about her feelings, and confides that she does not know how to express them; Cera agrees to teach her. Meanwhile, the children are attending a school in which they are taught by an old Pachyrhinosaurus named Mr. Thicknose, who professes to have been everywhere and seen everything. Littlefoot eagerly questions the topics they cover, to the old dinosaur's irritation. Eventually, Mr. Thicknose complains to Grandpa Longneck about Littlefoot's behavior. Littlefoot's Grandpa, knowing Littlefoot meant no harm, explains to him why he must be more respectful to Mr. Thicknose.

Meanwhile, as Ducky treats Spike coldly, Spike meets and befriends Tippy, a young dinosaur from a migrating Spiketail herd that has recently arrived in the Great Valley. Ducky begins to miss Spike when he spends more and more time with the Spiketail herd. One day, the entire Valley is surprised by an overnight snowfall. While the children together have fun frolicking in the snow, the adults complain that Mr. Thicknose, purportedly the wisest in all of the Valley, did not warn them about this impending weather, and suspect that he does not  much as he claims.

As time goes on, the dinosaurs begin to suffer from the freezing temperatures (through the Big Freeze)  and the lack of food growth. The Spiketail herd leaves, as they consume more food than most species. Tippy's mother asks Ducky and Spike's mother, Mama Swimmer, if she can take Spike along during the cold time; Mama Swimmer decides that Spike should choose between staying in the Valley or leaving with the Spiketails. Spike is unsure, so Ducky angrily tells him to leave, which he agrees to do. Afterwards, however, she regrets her actions, and later sneaks away to follow the herd.

When her friends find out, they head off into the Mysterious Beyond to find her, but are interrupted by Mr. Thicknose, who decides to accompany them. After several mishaps, they encounter a sharptooth (an Albertosaurus), but the kids defeat it with a giant snowball. In the process, they join up with Ducky, who was being chased by it earlier. Soon, they come across a frozen pool of water that they accidentally break. Underneath the ice is a warm spring, and they notice there is lush food nearby. While they relax in the water and feed, Mr. Thicknose confesses that most of his knowledge comes from secondary sources; he listened to the stories of other travelers when he was a child, and in his adult years, he shared those stories to the children in the Valley.

The sharptooth from earlier attacks them again, but Mr. Thicknose saves the children by pushing a log off the hill, causing the sharptooth to trip onto it and roll off a cliff to its presumed death. Later, the group tries to contact the Valley's residents but find that a wall of snow has blocked them from entry. Ducky, remembering what Cera taught her, suggests that Cera gets angry. She does so, and her enraged screaming causes the snow to fall down, enabling the Valley's residents to pass through. Meanwhile, the Spiketail herd is starving until Spike picks up the spring's scent. He leads the Spiketails there and reunites with Ducky. However, he falls into a deep part of the spring, and as he is unable to swim, Mama Swimmer jumps in to save him. When she places him on dry ground again, Tippy's mother says that Spike should stay with his family, rather than her herd. Ducky promises to Spike that she will not get angry at him whenever he snores, ever again.

Voice cast 

 Thomas Dekker as Littlefoot
 Anndi McAfee as Cera
 Aria Curzon as Ducky
 Jeff Bennett as Petrie / Corythosaurus
 Rob Paulsen as Spike / Leading Stegosaurus
 Tress MacNeille as Ducky's Mom / Petrie's Mom
 Susan Krebs as Tippy's Mom / Ankylosaurus
 Jeremy Suarez as Tippy
 Robert Guillaume as Mr. Thicknose
 Kenneth Mars as Grandpa Longneck  / Lambeosaurus
 Miriam Flynn as Grandma Longneck
 John Ingle as Narrator / Topsy

Production 
By June 2000, Universal had begun working on the film.

Songs

Release 
 December 4, 2001 (VHS and DVD)
 December 2, 2003 (VHS and DVD - 4 Movie Dino Pack (Volume 2) and 9 Movie Dino Pack)
 February 7, 2006 (DVD - 2 Dino-Riffic Adventures)
 August 5, 2008 (Carrying Case DVD with Fun Activity Book - 2 Dino-Riffic Adventures - Universal Watch on the Go)

Reception 
The film received nominations for "Best Animated Character Performance" for Robert Guillaume as Mr. Thicknose and "Best Animated Video Premier" at the Video Premiere Awards in 2001, losing to Lady and the Tramp II: Scamp's Adventure and Barbie in the Nutcracker, respectively. The Big Freeze was also nominated for Best Sound Editing at the 49th Gold Reel Awards in 2002, beaten by Ruby's Bucket of Blood. Aria Curzon received an award for "Outstanding Young Voice-Over" at the 23rd Young Artist Awards in 2002 for her role as Ducky in this film, as well as The Land Before Time V, The Land Before Time VI, and The Land Before Time VII. When the film was released on home video, it sold 2.5 million copies exceeding the previous entry's sales by 20%, and bringing the total lifetime sales of the entire series to 50 million at that point.

References

External links 

 
 

2001 direct-to-video films
Direct-to-video sequel films
The Land Before Time films
2001 animated films
2001 films
Films scored by Michael Tavera
Universal Animation Studios animated films
Universal Pictures direct-to-video animated films
2000s American animated films
Animated films about dinosaurs
2000s children's animated films
2000s English-language films